Li Xin’ai (born 10 April 1990), also known as Lee Hsin Ai, is a Chinese actress. She is of one-quarter Russian origin. She made her acting debut in Jay Chou's film The Rooftop.

Filmography

Film

Television series

Discography

References

1990 births
Actresses from Xi'an
Chinese film actresses
Living people
Chinese television actresses
21st-century Chinese actresses
Chinese people of Russian descent